Lucile P. Hicks (born May 11, 1938) is an American Republican politician from Wayland, Massachusetts.

Hicks was born on May 11, 1938, in Greenwood, Mississippi. She graduated from Millsaps College in 1960 and Harvard Kennedy School of Government in 1986. She represented the 13th Middlesex district in the Massachusetts House of Representatives from 1981 to 1990 and the 5th Middlesex district in the Massachusetts Senate from 1990 to 1996. She was the House minority whip from 1987 to 1988 and the first assistant minority leader of the Senate from 1993 to 1997.

See also
 1981-1982 Massachusetts legislature
 1983-1984 Massachusetts legislature
 1985-1986 Massachusetts legislature
 1987-1988 Massachusetts legislature
 1989-1990 Massachusetts legislature
 1991-1992 Massachusetts legislature
 1993-1994 Massachusetts legislature
 1995-1996 Massachusetts legislature

References

1938 births
Members of the Massachusetts House of Representatives
Women state legislators in Massachusetts
20th-century American women politicians
20th-century American politicians
People from Greenwood, Mississippi
People from Wayland, Massachusetts
Millsaps College alumni
Harvard Kennedy School alumni
Living people
21st-century American women